Webb City High School (or WCHS) is a public high school located in Webb City, Missouri, founded in 1877. The school serves students in grades 9 through 12 and is the only traditional high school in the School District of Webb City R-7. Webb City High School is a part of Missouri State High School Activities Association which acts as the governing body for high school activities throughout the state of Missouri.

According to the 2013 U.S. News & World Report, Webb City High School is ranked as the 17th best high school out of 560 in the state of Missouri. The school is highly rated academically. The school is well known for its academic activities including Speech and Debate, Academic Bowl, and Future Business Leaders of America. Its marching band has been very successful in competition and was invited to perform in the 2006 and 2010 Rose Parade. The high school is perhaps best known for its sports program which has won sixteen football championships, two baseball and softball championships, and one championship in boys' and girls' basketball since 1989.

Location and campus
The first Webb City schoolhouse was built in 1877 at the corner of Webb & Joplin (now Broadway) Streets. This building was called "Central School". In 1889, four more rooms were added to Central School and a high school was established, which occupied one room of the school. Originally, the high school course was only two years' work. However, by 1892 the course was extended to four years due to population growth. Until 1890, Central School was the only school in Webb City. In 1892, West Side School was built and the high school was moved there, occupying one room of the building. Two area churches were also used as high school classrooms during this time.

In 1894, the original wood frame Central School was replaced by a brick structure and the high school returned to Central School, occupying three rooms of the new building. Central School continued to serve as the high school until 1911.

In 1911, a new high school, located on Joplin Street (now Broadway) was opened and grades 9 through 12 were moved there. This building was erected in 1909, and served as the high school until 1972. This building now houses the district's junior high school serving grades 7 and 8.

In 1972, a new high school was built on 621 North Madison (on the site of the old Hatton Athletic Field) and it is still in use today. It was expanded in the years 1973, 1975, 1983, 1987, 1994, 1997, 1999, 2004, 2009, 2015 and 2017. The most recent addition added a new gymnasium and a storm shelter in a dome shape, known as the "Cardinal Dome".

Athletics
Its football team has won 16 Missouri state football championships, in the years 1989, 1992, 1993, 1997, 2000, 2001, 2006, 2008, 2010, 2011, 2012, 2013, 2014, 2017, 2019 and 2021.

Performing arts
WCHS has three competitive show choirs, the mixed-gender "Singers", women's-only "Bella Vocé" and men's-only "DoMENance". The school also hosts its own competition every year, the Webb City Showcase.

Notable people

=Alumni
 Clete Boyer - Professional Baseball Player (MLB) 1959–1969, member of the 1961 and 1962 New York Yankee World Championship team, Class of 1955
 Cloyd Boyer - Professional Baseball Player (MLB) 1949–1955, St. Louis Cardinals and Kansas City Athletics, Class of 1945.
 Ken Boyer - Professional Baseball Player (MLB), St. Louis Cardinals, National League MVP and World Series championship in 1964, Class of 1949.
 Lisa Myers - NBC News Senior Investigative Correspondent, Class of 1969.
 Hugh Sprinkle - NFL player
 Grant Wistrom - Retired Professional Football Player (NFL), Class of 1994.
 James Jordan, film and television actor, Class of 1997.

Faculty
Jerry Kill - former football coach

References

External links
 Webb City H.S.

Public high schools in Missouri
Schools in Jasper County, Missouri